Masked Marvel may refer to:

Masked Marvel (Centaur Publications), a fictional superhero originally published by Centaur Publications
Masked Marvel (Marvel Comics), an alternate name of Speedball, a fictional superhero in the Marvel Comics universe
Masked Marvel (horse), a thoroughbred racehorse who won the 2011 St. Leger Stakes
The Masked Marvel, a 1940s Republic Pictures serial
Charley Patton, an American Delta Blues musician who recorded and performed under that name in the 1930s
John Bonica, a Sicilian American anesthesiologist and professional wrestler
Cyclone Mackey, the first wrestler to work masked in Mexico
Luc Poirier, a professional wrestler who performed under that name in the early 1980s